The 1953 Summer Deaflympics officially known as 7th Deaflympics is an international multi-sport event that was held from 15 August 1953 to 19 August 1953. The event was hosted by Brussels, Belgium.

The 1953 Summer Deaflympics saw Australia as the second non-European country to enter. The American team in 1935.

The following countries participated in the 1953 Deaflympics:
 Australia
 Austria
 Belgium
 Denmark
 Finland
 France
 Germany
 Great Britain
 Italy
 Netherlands
 Norway
 Saar
 Sweden
 Switzerland
 United States
 Yugoslavia

References 

((Deaflympics))

Deaflympics
International sports competitions hosted by Belgium
Summer Deaflympics
Summer Deaflympics, 1953
Summer Deaflympics